Punta Gorda Lighthouse is a lighthouse in the United States,  south of Cape Mendocino, California, within Humboldt County.  Access is via a short hike from the end of a 4WD road.  It is managed by the Bureau of Land Management.

History
Punta Gorda Lighthouse was built in 1911 and was first lit in 1912. 
After World War II, it was decided that given the remoteness of the station it was too costly to maintain. A lighted buoy was placed offshore, the fourth order Fresnel lens  was removed, and the station was boarded up and deactivated in 1951. The keeper's house and all other station buildings were eventually demolished except the reinforced concrete light station building and the metal framework for the lantern room atop it and the reinforced concrete oil house were left standing.

Historical Information from USCG web site:

Punta Gorda originally consisted of  upon which were situated three dwellings, a small two-story concrete lighthouse, concrete oil house, a wooden fog signal building, blacksmith/carpenter-shop, three storage sheds, and a barn. In 1951 all aids-to-navigation were discontinued, the buildings boarded up and personnel  transferred.  The property was transferred to the Bureau of Land Management. In the late 1960s "hippies" moved into the quarters and improved them. Local authorities evicted these people and the Bureau of Land Management burned all the buildings except the Lighthouse and oil house. Punta Gorda was and is a very difficult station to reach. Most of the years it was in operation access was via horse, and during good weather horse-drawn wagon. After the United States Coast Guard assumed command a rough road was constructed (that usually washed out) and a jeep was used for transportation. One Coast Guard career horse, named Old Bill, served the Punta Gorda Light Station as a saddle horse, pack horse, and buggy horse for thirty years until the station closed in 1951.

The lighthouse was placed on the National Register of Historic Places in 1976. The Fresnel lens and the flag staff pole were removed many years ago to the Humboldt Bay Maritime Museum located near Eureka, California.

The Punta Gorda Light was known as the "Alcatraz of Lighthouses" because of its remote location and difficult access.

Keepers
Head 
 Frederick A. Harrington (1911 – at least 1918)
 James Dunn (at least 1919 – at least 1921) 
 Herbert H. Luff (at least 1926 – 1928)
 Charles W. Lindley (1928 – 1939)
 Perry S. Hunter (1939 – 1940)
 Harmon A. Day (1940 – at least 1942)
 Samuel “Hank” – Mostovoy (at least 1949 – 1951)
 Benjamin McPherson Ficklin (1990–Present)

See also

 List of lighthouses in the United States
 Trinidad Head Light: another historic lighthouse in Humboldt County
 National Register of Historic Places listings in Humboldt County, California

References

External links

 

Lighthouses on the National Register of Historic Places in California
Transportation buildings and structures in Humboldt County, California
Lighthouses completed in 1911
1911 establishments in California
National Register of Historic Places in Humboldt County, California